Brotherband is a series of children's fantasy novels written by Australian author John Flanagan. The first book, The Outcasts, was released in Australia and the United States on 1 November 2011 and in New Zealand on 4 November 2011. The series is a spin-off from Flanagan's other highly popular series, Ranger's Apprentice, but it concentrates on new Skandian characters. It was published by Penguin in the US and Random House in Australia and New Zealand.

References

External links
 Official website

 
Brotherband books
21st-century Australian novels
Fantasy novel series
Australian fantasy novel series